The 2018–19 season was MOL Vidi FC's 51st competitive season, 20th consecutive season in the OTP Bank Liga and 78th year in existence as a football club.

First team squad

Transfers

Summer

In:

Out:

Source:

Winter

In:

Out:

Statistics

Appearances and goals
Last updated on 25 May 2019.

|-
|colspan="14"|Out to loan:

|-
|colspan="14"|Players no longer at the Club:

|}

Top scorers
Includes all competitive matches. The list is sorted by shirt number when total goals are equal.
Last updated on 25 May 2019

Disciplinary record
Includes all competitive matches. Players with 1 card or more included only.

Last updated on 25 May 2019

Overall
{|class="wikitable"
|-
|Games played || 57 (33 OTP Bank Liga, 14 CL/EL and 10 Hungarian Cup)
|-
|Games won || 32 (18 OTP Bank Liga, 4 CL/EL and 10 Hungarian Cup)
|-
|Games drawn || 13 (7 OTP Bank Liga, 6 CL/EL and 0 Hungarian Cup)
|-
|Games lost || 12 (8 OTP Bank Liga, 4 CL/EL and 0 Hungarian Cup)
|-
|Goals scored || 86
|-
|Goals conceded || 53
|-
|Goal difference || +33
|-
|Yellow cards || 166
|-
|Red cards || 3
|-
|rowspan="1"|Worst discipline ||  Anel Hadžić (16 , 1 )
|-
|rowspan="2"|Best result || 4–0 (H) v Kisvárda - Nemzeti Bajnokság I - 21-7-2018
|-
| 4–0 (A) v Paks - Nemzeti Bajnokság I - 3-11-2018
|-
|rowspan="3"|Worst result || 0–3 (H) v MTK Budapest - Nemzeti Bajnokság I - 7-10-2018
|-
| 0–3 (H) v Puskás Akadémia - Nemzeti Bajnokság I - 2-2-2019
|-
| 1–4 (A) v Ferencváros - Nemzeti Bajnokság I - 20-4-2019
|-
|rowspan="1"|Most appearances ||  Loïc Nego (57 appearances)
|-
|rowspan="1"|Top scorer ||  Marko Šćepović (14 goals)
|-
|Points || 107/171 (62.57%)
|-

Nemzeti Bajnokság I

Matches

League table

Results summary

Results by round

Hungarian Cup

Champions League

Europa League

Group stage

References

External links
 Official Website
 UEFA
 fixtures and results

Fehérvár FC seasons
Hungarian football clubs 2018–19 season